The St. George Reef Light is an inactive lighthouse built on North West Seal Rock, six miles (10 km) off the coast of northern California near Crescent City.

Location
The St. George Reef Light is a wave-washed lighthouse, one where the ocean hits from all sides. The location of the light on North West Seal Rock, part of the line of "Dragon Rocks" thus named by Sir Francis Drake, was selected after numerous accidents and the wreck of the overloaded Brother Jonathan on July 30, 1865. The loss of prominent people on the steamer was an impetus to the light's approval; nonetheless, it took until 1892 to complete due to the changing availability of federal construction funds.

Construction

The light was first illuminated on October 20, 1892. The first complete survey of the rock was done in 1882, and construction began in 1883, with the blasting of the reef rock into a stepped pyramid to form the core that anchored the caisson to the rock. The granite was rough quarried at the Mad River quarry and moved by train across the Arcata bottoms. The fully loaded train cars were loaded on barges pulled down the Mad River Slough (not same as the river) and across Humboldt Bay to the construction yard near the Humboldt Bay Life-Saving Station at Paysonville. Trained quarrymen smoothed and shaped the blocks to fit the outlines of templates cut by the designers. Each stone had to fit within tight tolerances to provide a seamless wall against the ocean. Construction was erratic for several years due to lack of funds allotted by Congress. Work was finally completed in 1891, but the lighthouse awaited arrival of its lens from France until the following year. When the light finally became operational in 1892, the total construction expense came to $752,000 (equivalent to $ today) making it the most expensive lighthouse ever built in the US and more than double the initial estimate.

Operations
Duty at St. George Reef was among the most difficult of any station, due to its remote location and being surrounded by unpredictable, treacherous seas. Several people died during its construction and operation, dozens resigned or sought transfer, and a few even suffered mental breakdowns. Supplies came by launch, and the entire boat was hooked on the large boom and lifted to a boat deck at the base of the caisson.

Termination and preservation efforts
The light station was replaced by a "floating lighthouse" buoy and decommissioned in 1975, and its -high first-order Fresnel lens was removed in 1983 for display at the Del Norte County Historical Museum in Crescent City. In 1996, the lighthouse was transferred to the St. George Reef Lighthouse Preservation Society, which conducts ongoing restoration work as well as tours of the site by helicopter from October through June. The lighthouse was relighted on March 10, 2012. The light can be seen from Brookings, Oregon, to Crescent City, California.

After 16 years of safe operation and less than a month after the relighting ceremony, the St. George Reef Lighthouse Preservation Society received a cease-and-desist order from the California State Department of Transportation suspending all helicopter flights, both for maintenance and tourism, to the lighthouse. This was due to a lack of a permit-certified heliport. Tours resumed in 2018 after the construction of a heliport at the base of the tower.

The lighthouse was listed in the National Register of Historic Places, reference number 93001373, on December 9, 1993, and was commemorated on a USPS postage stamp in 2007.

Historical information from USCG web site

See also

 List of lighthouses in the United States
 National Register of Historic Places listings in Del Norte County, California

References

External links

 St. George Reef Lighthouse Preservation Society
 Del Norte County Historical Society
 Building plans for St. George Reef Lighthouse, National Archives and Records Administration
 St. George Reef Lighthouse, Lighthouse Friends
 

Lighthouses on the National Register of Historic Places in California
Crescent City, California
Buildings and structures in Del Norte County, California
History of Del Norte County, California
Lighthouses completed in 1891
1891 establishments in California
National Register of Historic Places in Del Norte County, California